, also known as Key of Keys, is a 1965 Japanese comedy-spy film directed by Senkichi Taniguchi. It is the fourth installment of five films in the Kokusai himitsu keisatsu series, a parody of James Bond-style spy movies.

Woody Allen used this film, combined with footage from the third installment , to create his directorial debut, What's Up, Tiger Lily?, in which the original dialogue is redubbed in English to make the plot about a secret egg salad recipe.

Plot 
Kitami, who had arrived in Tonwan, was asked by the director of intelligence, Suritai, to steal a large amount of money they had hidden from Gegen, a crime boss and leader of the Tonwanian rebel guerrilla association "Darkness" along with two female agents, Miichin and Bai-Lan. The three who traveled to the port city of Yokohama in pursuit of the Gegen Gang who earned money through illegal gambling and prostitution. Gegan main rival was Chinese mafia led by gangster He-Qing Cai who had blood on his head when Gegen steal the territory of Yokohama. Using the disguise and teamed up with Cai, they boarded on Gegan's ship to steal the safe. However, there was no cash in the safe inside the ship, only a piece of paper with a text that looked like a code.

Cast 
Tatsuya Mihashi as Agent Jiro Kitami
Susumu Kurobe as He-Qing Cai (Triad boss)
Tadao Nakamaru as Gegen (Chief of the rebel guerrilla association "Darkness")
Mie Hama as Mi Chen (Tonwanian spy)
Akiko Wakabayashi as White Orchid,(Safe-cracking thief)
Tetsu Nakamura as Suritai (Director of National Intelligence)
Shoji Oki as Dorodo (Gegen's minion)
Sachio Sakai as Inagawa (Cai's minion) 
Eisei Amamoto as Ikeguchi  (Cai's minion)
Monica Bead as Barro
Akemi Kita as Yoko (Call girl)
Nadao Kirno as Cho (Tonwan Army Officer)
Koji Iwamoto as Ton Won man 1
Toru Ibuki as Ton Won man 2
Koji Uruki as Ton Won man 3
J. Jones as White Caucasian woman
Seiji Ikeda
Hiroshi Akitsu
Akira Kishoji

References

External links 

1965 films
1960s Japanese-language films
1960s Japanese films
Toho films
Japanese comedy films
Films directed by Senkichi Taniguchi
Films produced by Tomoyuki Tanaka
1960s spy films
Parody films based on James Bond films
1960s spy comedy films
1960s parody films
1965 comedy films